The Royal Standard of Thailand ( Thong Maharat) is the official flag of the King of Thailand. The present form was adopted in 1910 under Vajiravudh (Rama VI), superseding the first Royal Standard created by Mongkut in 1855. In 1979, the designs were codified by law; specifically in Article 2 of the Flag Act of 1979 (พระราชบัญญัติธง พ.ศ. ๒๕๒๒), which also regulated Thailand's other flags. The standard is currently used by Maha Vajiralongkorn, also known as Rama X, since 2016.

Description 
The Royal Standard consists of a bright yellow square with a red Royal Garuda at the center. The mythical Hindu and Buddhist beast, the Garuda, is the national emblem and the official symbol or 'arms' of the King. The Garuda has been the symbol of the monarchy since Ayutthaya. Readopted in 1910, Vajiravudh decided to replace all of the Royal Standards to feature the Garuda.

Uses
The standards are usually hoisted at the King's palace of residence, sea or land vehicles and as an emblem on the side of the royal aircraft. The standard is also used on ceremonial occasions and official business by the King. The use of these standards are reserved exclusively to the monarchy and are not commonly seen. Unlike the King's personal flag which are commonly seen all over Thailand, usually flying alongside the National flag.

Other members of the royal family
The Law also adopted flags for other members of the Royal Family as well as the Regent of Thailand.

Gallery

Historical standards

Fourth reign
Mongkut (Rama IV) felt the need to create a Royal standard to distinguish his royal barge from other vessels during his many travels around the Kingdom and to fly above the Grand Palace when he is in residence. In 1855 a Royal Standard was created called the 'Thong Chom Klao' (ธงจอมเกล้า).

The standard featured a red rectangular flag with a smaller dark blue rectangle inside. Within the dark blue rectangle depicts the Great Crown of Victory on a stand flanked by two seven-tiered Royal Umbrellas. The Crown itself is derived from the King's personal seal, which in itself is a canting of both his given name and ceremonial name: Mongkut (มงกุฎ) and Chom Klao (จอมเกล้า) both meaning 'Crown' in Thai. The crown and the umbrellas are situated on a golden platform.

However the sight of an empty flagpole when the King was not in residence at the palace was considered inauspicious, therefore a second flag was ordered to be hoisted during the King's absence. This flag is called the 'Thong Airapot' (ธงไอยราพต), the rectangular red flag depicts a mythical three-headed white elephant (Airavata) in full regalia standing on a golden base with a golden pavilion on its back. Within the pavilion is the Thai symbol for Aum or Unalom. The elephant is then flanked on two sides are two seven-tiered Royal Umbrellas.

Fifth reign
In 1891, King Chulalongkorn (Rama V) decided to promulgate a new law to reform the Royal Standard and create for the first time ranks flags for members of the Royal Family. The Royal Standard was changed by adding the new Arms of Dominion, which is a golden shield divided into three parts. The first in yellow depicts a three-headed mythical elephant representing Siam, the second quarter in red depicts a single white elephant for Laos (Lan Xang) and the third quarter in pink depicts two crossed Krisses for the Malay suzerainty (Siam was later forced to relinquish these territories by the French and British, respectively). Inside the crown the symbol for the Chakri Dynasty is added; it depicts an intertwined Chakra and Trisula. The flag ratio is 5:6 The name of the Royal Standard was then changed to  'Thong Boromrajathawat Maha Siaminthra' (ธงบรมราชธวัชมหาสยามินทร์), A few years later in 1897 the name was permanently changed to 'Thong Maharaj'.

The King retained the second colours by replacing the Unalom with his own Royal cypher (จ ป ร, derive from "จุฬาลงกรณ์ ปรมราชาธิราช": Chulalongkorn Paramarajadhiraja; equivalent to Chulalongkorn Rex), which in turn is topped by the Royal Coronet or Phra Kiao (พระเกี้ยว). The name of this flag was also changed to the 'Thong Chudhathipathai' (ธงจุฑาธิปไตย).

Other members of the royal family

Sixth reign
In 1910 Vajiravudh replaced the Royal Standard and Royal rank flags to mirror the change of the national emblem from the Coat of Arms of Siam to the Royal Garuda. These flags are retained and in use to this day. Six years later he also redesigned the national flag and naval ensigns.

See also

Royal flags of Thailand - Personal flags of the various members of the Thai Royal Family
Emblem of Thailand
Monarchy of Thailand
Royal Standard
List of Thai flags

References

External links
Flag Act, Article 2 
Royal Standard of Thailand, FOTW page
Historical Royal Standards, FOTW page
 Siam Flag museum  
 www.kodmhai.com- Flag Act 1979 
 FOTW page

1
Thai monarchy
Thailand
Flags introduced in 1910
Flags displaying animals